The Scorpion EVO 3 is a 9mm carbine manufactured by Česká zbrojovka Uherský Brod, the select-fire submachine gun variant is designated A1, and the semi-automatic variant is designated S1. The EVO 3 designation denotes that the firearm is a third generation of CZ's line of small submachine guns started by the Škorpion vz. 61, which is mechanically unrelated.

Design details
The Scorpion Evo 3 is a blowback operated carbine evolved from a Slovak prototype submachine gun developed by Laugo. Chambered in 9×19mm Parabellum, the Scorpion EVO 3 is mostly polymer, making it a lightweight, compact submachine gun designed to be easily maneuvered in confined spaces. The A1 variant features a standard left-side non-reciprocating charging handle, although it is ambidextrous and can be switched from side-to-side. It also has an ambidextrous select fire switch, giving the operator the choice of "safe", semi-automatic, three-round burst, or fully automatic fire, while the S1's switch only features "safe" and semi-automatic fire. The standard version comes equipped with a folding, adjustable and fully removable stock for transport. The handguard is lined with multiple Picatinny rails for the addition of attachments such as grips, sights, flashlights, and lasers. The handguard on the American semi-automatic offering features M-LOK attachment points, with a single Picatinny rail on top.

Users

Current users 
 : Federal Law enforcement, Tucuman Police, San Juan Police
 : Toronto Police Service
 : Armed Forces of the Czech Republic
 : Law enforcement Units
 : Police of Finland, Finnish Border Guard
 : Ministry of Internal Affairs of Georgia, Border Police of Georgia, Coast Guard of Georgia
 : Hungarian Police, Hungarian Defence Forces
 : Indonesian National Police
 : Kenya Police Service
 : Royal Malaysia Police, Malaysian Maritime Enforcement Agency, Royal Johor Military Force.
 : Philippine Coast Guard-Special Operations Group, Philippine National Police-Special Action Force
: Special forces
 : Royal Thai Police
 : Used by Underwater Offence.
 : Unknown quantities delivered from the Czech Republic, deployed in combat in the 2022 Russian invasion of Ukraine.
  Vietnam: People's Public Security drug enforcement unit (Bureau C47), Army's Competition Rifle Team, Guards Command (K01)

Former users 

  Islamic Republic of Afghanistan: Used by ANA Commandos.

References

External links 

 CZ-USA Official Website
 CZ Official Website
 Owners Manual

9mm Parabellum submachine guns
Submachine guns of Czechoslovakia
Weapons and ammunition introduced in 2009